"Black Stone" is a single released by Gackt on April 27, 2005 under Nippon Crown. It peaked at third place on the Oricon weekly chart and charted for seven weeks. It was certified gold by RIAJ.

Track listing

References

2005 singles
Gackt songs
2005 songs
Songs written by Gackt